Corcelles-Sud railway station is a railway station in the municipality of Corcelles-près-Payerne, in the Swiss canton of Vaud. It is an intermediate stop on the standard gauge Fribourg–Yverdon line of Swiss Federal Railways.

Services
The following services stop at Corcelles-Sud:

References

External links 
 
 

Railway stations in the canton of Vaud
Swiss Federal Railways stations